Quisp may refer to:

Quisp, the name of both a brand of cereal and the cartoon mascot used in promoting it

See also
Qwsp (formerly known as Quisp), the name of a fictional supervillain in the DC comics universe